τ
Wars involving Hezbollah

The 2006 Marjayoun convoy was a convoy of approximately 759 vehicles containing Lebanese police, army, civilians, and one Associated Press journalist, which was attacked by the Israeli Air Force (IAF) as it travelled away from the area of Marjayoun on August 11, 2006.

The bombing resulted in the deaths of at least seven people, wounding of at least 36, and the destruction of a number of vehicles. The attacks took place during the 2006 Lebanon War.

Timeline of events

The convoy had set out on August 11 after the Israeli Army entered the Lebanese army base in Marjayoun on August 10.  The IDF took over the base and an evacuation of the Lebanese troops was arranged via UNIFIL.  In their press release for August 12, UNIFIL described the sequence of events:
"At the request of the Lebanese government, UNIFIL was in contact with the IDF to facilitate the withdrawal of the Lebanese Joint Security Forces (JSF) from Marjayoun yesterday. Israeli forces informed UNIFIL that they agree to such a request. Yesterday afternoon, the JSF convoy (87 vehicles with around 350 troops, all ranks), which was joined by the Internal Security Forces (10 vehicles with around 40 troops) and around 100 civilian vehicles, left the town of Marjayoun. UNIFIL informed the IDF about the convoy and its planned route to Beirut through the west Beka’a valley. The convoy followed 2 UNIFIL APCs out of the town to Ibil as Saqi. It was reported that 365 additional civilian vehicles from Marjayoun joined the convoy in the area of Ibil as Saqi."
"Subsequently, the convoy departed from UNIFIL area of operations and continued north. At around 22.00 hours, the Lebanese authorities informed UNIFIL that the convoy came under Israeli air strikes in the general area of Kefraya in the west Beka’a, and a number of people were killed and wounded. UNIFIL conveyed this information to the IDF and asked them to immediately cease attacks on the convoy. At the request of the Lebanese authorities today, UNIFIL requested the IDF to give security clearance for the convoy to proceed towards Beirut."

The convoy was escorted by two UNIFIL vehicles as far as the town of Hasbaya,  from Marjayoun. The attack was conducted with nine bombs, Lebanese authorities said.

Timeline according to the IDF 
Immediately after the attack, the IDF reportedly said they were "investigating the incident".  A statement from the IDF was released on 12 August and said that after receiving a request for the convoy to depart, the IDF had denied it. The statement also said that before the attack the IDF had "identified suspicious movement along a route forbidden for travel which had been used by Hizbullah to transport rockets and other weaponry." The IDF also stated that they suspected that the movement represented "Hizbullah terrorists transporting weaponry."  The IDF also said that they were told by UNIFIL after the attacks that the convoy was civilian.

The IDF also pointed out that a leaflet drop and announcement had been issued on 7 August, prohibiting the movement of any type of vehicle in all areas south of the Litani River. The limitation took effect at 22:00 on August 7, 2006, and was in force when the attack took place.  The attack however occurred north of the Litani close to Kefraya.

Medical and humanitarian response
An AP photographer with the convoy said that there was an attack on Red Cross and civil defense vehicles coming to the convoy's aid, but that it was unknown if anyone was hurt. The Red Cross also said six civilians died, 32 were wounded, and that a Lebanese Red Cross first-aid volunteer, Mikhael Jbayleh, was also killed at the scene as he tended to the wounded.

Reactions
UN spokesman Milos Strugar said of the attack: "UNIFIL left the convoy at that place [Hasbaya], the Israeli forces had been told in advance of the convoy's passage, and had given it the green light".

Head of the Lebanese Red Cross's rescue teams, George Kettaneh, said the convoy had been "deliberately targeted" by the IDF.

Lebanese President Émile Lahoud condemned the IDF attack, saying: "the Israeli bombardment of the convoy [took place] despite an agreement negotiated by UNIFIL guaranteeing its safety".

See also
2006 Qana airstrike
2006 Qaa airstrike
2006 al-Qaa airstrike
2006 Shiyyah airstrike
2006 Ghaziyeh airstrikes

References

External links

Qaa
Airstrikes conducted by Israel
August 2006 events in Asia